Dhakam is an Indian Tamil-language romantic drama film directed by Babu Nanthankode in his debut. He co-wrote the story with T. Vaiyadurai, who handled the cinematography. The film stars R. Muthuraman and Nanditha Bose. Filmed in 1972, it did not see a theatrical release, but has been screened at many film festivals.

Plot 

Sharada, an orphan, lives with other orphans in an ashram, where she bonds with a Sekhar, a blind man. They eventually marry, and she tries to make a living as a saleswoman in Madras, but city life is too much for them and they return to the ashram. Sharada dies, having donated her eyes to a blind person.

Cast 
 R. Muthuraman as Sekhar
 Nanditha Bose as Sharada

Other supporting roles are played by Major Sundarrajan, Pandari Bai, Rajakokila, Renuka Parvathi and Jayaseelam.

Production 
Dhakam, the directorial debut of Babu Nanthankode, was conceived by him and T. Vaiyadurai while they were working at the staff of the Madras Film Institute. It was produced by Janakiraman under the banner Kavya Chitra. The screenplay was written by K. K. Raman, based on the story of Nanthankode and Vaiyadurai; the latter also handled the cinematography. Shooting took place in 1972, primarily at Gandhigram, Tamil Nadu. The final cut of the film measured 144 minutes.

Soundtrack 
The soundtrack was composed by M. B. Sreenivasan, while Bharati and Poovai Senguttuvan were the lyricists. The songs "Vanam Namadhu Thanthai" and "Bharata Samudayam" attained popularity.

Release and reception 
Dhakam did not have a theatrical release, but has been screened at many film festivals. Kanthan of Kalki appreciated the film for eschewing stylish costumes, makeup for the lead actors, and elaborate sets.

Legacy 
Dhakam was influential in establishing the art film scenario in Tamil cinema. Ashish Rajadhyaksha and Paul Willemen, in their book Encyclopedia of Indian Cinema, say the film served as an inspiration for Aval Appadithan (1978).

References

Bibliography

External links 
 

1972 romantic drama films
1970s Tamil-language films
Films directed by Babu Nanthankode
Films scored by M. B. Sreenivasan
Indian romantic drama films